Timothy Lennart "Tim" Kopra (born April 9, 1963) is an engineer, a Colonel in the United States Army and a retired NASA astronaut. He served aboard the International Space Station as a flight engineer for Expedition 20, returning to Earth aboard Space Shuttle Discovery on the STS-128 mission on September 11, 2009. He returned to the ISS for the second time in December 2015, as part of Expedition 46 and as the commander of 47.

In 2020, he was announced as the vice president of robotics and space operations at MDA Corporation.

Personal
Kopra was born in Austin, Texas. Kopra is married to Dawn Kaye Lehman of Lewisburg, Kentucky, and they have two children, Matthew and Jacqueline. His mother, Martha A. Witthoft Kopra, resides in Austin, Texas. His father, Dr. Lennart L. Kopra, died December 8, 1998. He is of Finnish descent on his father's side. His grandfather, Antti Kopra, born in Laavola, Valkjärvi, Karelia, and his grandmother, Ester Elisabet Saksinen, born in Helsinki, left Finland in 1914, immigrating to the United States. Kopra's father spoke Finnish, but Tim does not speak the language. On his mother's side, Kopra is of German descent. His German ancestors arrived in New York in the colonial period in the 1700s.  These ancestors include Johann Philipp and Anna Catharina Finckel, who were members of the first group of Palatine Germans who settled in Germantown in the Hudson Valley in 1710.

Education
 1981: Graduated from McCallum High School, Austin, Texas
 1985: Received a Bachelor of Science degree from the United States Military Academy, West Point, New York
 1995: Received a Master of Science degree in aerospace engineering, Georgia Institute of Technology
 2006: Received a Master of Strategic Studies degree from the United States Army War College
 2013: Received a Master of Business Administration degree from the London Business School
 2013: Received a Master of Business Administration degree from the Columbia Business School.

Organizations
Society of Experimental Test Pilots
Army Aviation Association of America
American Helicopter Society
United States Military Academy Association of Graduates
West Point Society of Greater Houston
Phi Kappa Phi

Awards and honors
Empire Test Pilot School Award for the best developmental test thesis, Class 110, U.S. Naval Test Pilot School (1996),
Silver and Bronze Order of Saint Michael, Army Aviation Award (2009, 1999),
Awarded the Bronze Star, two Meritorious Service Medals, Air Medal, Army Commendation Medal, Army Achievement Medal, NASA Space Flight Medal, NASA Distinguished Service Medal, and various other service awards.

Military career
Kopra received his commission as a second lieutenant from the U.S. Military Academy in May 1985 and was designated as an Army aviator in August 1986. He then completed a three-year assignment at Fort Campbell, Kentucky, where he served as an aeroscout platoon leader, troop executive officer, and squadron adjutant in the 101st Airborne Division's air cavalry squadron. In 1990, he was assigned to the 3rd Armored Division in Hanau, Germany, and was deployed to the Middle East in support of Operations Desert Shield and Desert Storm. He completed his tour in Germany as an attack helicopter company commander and an operations officer. Kopra retired from the U.S. Army in November 2010.

NASA career
Kopra was assigned to NASA at the Johnson Space Center in September 1998 as a vehicle integration test engineer. In this position, he primarily served as an engineering liaison for Space Shuttle launch operations and International Space Station hardware testing. He was actively involved in the contractor tests of the Extravehicular Activity (EVA) interfaces for each of the space station truss segments.
Selected as a mission specialist by NASA in July 2000, Kopra reported for Astronaut Candidate Training the following month. He then completed the initial two years of intensive Space Shuttle and ISS training, scientific and technical briefings, and T-38 flight training. Kopra was also assigned technical duties in the Space Station Branch of the Astronaut Office, where his primary focus was the testing of crew interfaces for two future ISS modules as well as the implementation of support computers and operational Local Area Network on International Space Station.

In September 2006, Kopra served as an aquanaut during the NEEMO 11 mission aboard the Aquarius underwater laboratory, living and working underwater for seven days.

Expedition 20

Kopra spent a little less than 60 days as a flight engineer of Expedition 20 on the ISS, arriving aboard the station aboard space shuttle Endeavour on the STS-127 mission and returning to Earth aboard space shuttle Discovery on the STS-128 mission.  He participated in the first spacewalk of the STS-127 mission.

Kopra was assigned to fly on STS-133, the final flight of the Discovery. He lost that assignment when he was injured in a bicycle accident, possibly breaking his hip. He was replaced by Stephen G. Bowen.

Expedition 46/47

Kopra served as commander of the ISS, with Soyuz TMA-19M, as part of Expedition 46 / Expedition 47.  During a spacewalk on January 15, 2016, Kopra's spacesuit began to leak water into his helmet causing the walk to be cut short.  The suit he was using is the same suit that had developed a more serious water leak during a spacewalk by Italian astronaut Luca Parmitano. Kopra returned to Earth on Soyuz TMA-19M, and landed 18 June 2016 09:15 UTC, after spending 186 days in space.

Awards

References

External links

 
Spacefacts biography of Timothy L. Kopra

1963 births
Living people
Aquanauts
Columbia Business School alumni
United States Army astronauts
Commanders of the International Space Station
NASA civilian astronauts
Crew members of the International Space Station
American people of Finnish descent
American people of Karelian descent
People from Austin, Texas
United States Military Academy alumni
Georgia Tech alumni
United States Naval Test Pilot School alumni
United States Army War College alumni
United States Army colonels
United States Army personnel of the Gulf War
Recipients of the Air Medal
Recipients of the NASA Distinguished Service Medal
Space Shuttle program astronauts
Spacewalkers
Military personnel from Texas